Judes Bicaba (1947 – August 19, 2016) was a Burkinabé Roman Catholic bishop.

Ordained to the priesthood in 1975, Bicaba served as bishop of the Roman Catholic Diocese of Dédougou, Burkina Faso from 2005 until his death in 2016.

See also
Roman Catholicism in Burkina Faso

Notes

1947 births
2016 deaths
21st-century Roman Catholic bishops in Burkina Faso
Roman Catholic bishops of Dédougou